War Front: Turning Point is a real-time strategy video game set in an alternate World War II. It was developed by Digital Reality, and published by CDV and released in 2007 for Microsoft Windows.

The game is set in a fictional, alternate World War II in which Adolf Hitler is assassinated in the early days of the war, and under the new chancellor, Germany occupies Great Britain. Eventually, Nazi Germany is defeated, but this allows the Soviet Union to advance into Western Europe. The game features both real life and fictional "experimental" war machines and units.

Gameplay
War Front: Turning Point is a real-time strategy game featuring units going from World War II weaponry such as Messerschmitt Me 262 fighter aircraft and M4 Sherman and T-34 tanks, to real-life units that were not present during that war such as Northrop YB-49 jet bomber, to entirely science fictional units like Exoskeleton mechs, freeze rays and shield generators, while all can build a "Bridging" tank unit capable of building bridges over bodies of water. Each faction can also build three heroes: individual characters with unique abilities, both passive and active to benefit the player's own units and act against the foe's units. The longer heroes and units remain on the battlefield, destroying units and buildings in the process, the more they can rank up, increasing their abilities, yet lose them if they are killed and re-built. The player can also use aerial support such as calling in paratrooper reinforcements, scouting runs and bomb strikes.

War Front: Turning Point however has an unconventional RTS feature, being the abilities to manually control pill boxes and turrets to fire upon enemies, like that of a first-person shooter. The camera can also be ordered to follow other units in a third-person perspective, where orders can still be given, but the units not be directly controlled like the turrets.

Along with the time of day changing dynamically in each game, random weather can affect effectiveness of units and interference. Storms, for example, can damage airplanes, and radars (mini-map view) can become distorted or even temporarily knocked out.

Online play 
War Front: Turning Point includes online play through GameRanger. Custom games can have up to ten players playing in one online game.

Factions

Allies
Like the real World War II Western Allies, they are a coalition of the United States, United Kingdom, and Free France. Because of this, their units are a mixture of each side, such as the British Matilda tank and American M26 Pershing. They have a technological advantage over the other factions, because their buildings are able to power themselves, without the need for power plants. They also have a superior air force that is larger, stronger and more versatile. These include aircraft such as the P-38 Lightning bomber (the only bomber capable of defending itself against interceptors) P-51 Mustang fighters and attack helicopters. The Allies also have the atomic bomb at their disposal, deployed by a Northrop YB-35 and an "earthquake bomb" via a Halifax bomber. The Allied experimental unit is the O.R.B. (Omni-Repulsor-Barrier), which is an APC truck with a force-field generator on the back, capable of protecting units, within its deflector shield range, from low to medium attacks.

Germany
The German forces are that of the real-life Wehrmacht, but under new, more effective leadership following the death of Adolf Hitler in the early stages of the war. Their army focuses more on firepower, with a wide range of ground armoured units. German tanks are particularly strong that include real-life and upgraded versions such as the Panzer VIII Maus, Elefant "tank hunter" and Tiger tank. They use Me 262 fighter aircraft and Junkers Ju 390s and Horten Ho 229s for bombing runs, with the ability to deploy V-1 flying bombs, which can be upgraded to a V-2 rocket. The Germans also have more varied experimental units than the other two factions. These include jet pack infantry equipped with flame throwers, heavy exoskeleton mech-like heavy infantry, Sonic tanks that use blasts of sonic waves (rather than conventional ammunition) and the Giant Zeppelin, which uses an aluminium structure and large air-to-ground cannons.

Soviet Union
The Soviet Union is less developed than the Allies and Germans; however, it uses sheer numbers to overwhelm its opposition. It has an expanded and more-effective selection of infantry. Along with the general Red Army infantry, the Soviets have Medics to heal nearby infantry, Commissars to boost morale (overall efficiency), Molotov infantry that uses Molotov cocktails rather than rockets, being a faster option and can be backed up by Vodka Dealers who can make nearby infantry invulnerable to damage while they're alive. Their heavy armour is also small yet does include some powerful machines, like the Kharkov Rampager that is slow yet equipped with multiple turrets. Their aircraft is both smaller and weaker, primarily using Tupolev TB-3 bombers, Il-2 Shturmovik ground-attack aircraft and Yakovlev Yak-1 interceptors. They do however have powerful experimental units like the Ice Spitter, capable of freezing other units along with a similar "freeze bomb" deployed by a Tupolev bomber. There is also the Giant Moving Turret that is slow with limited turret movement, but it has a long range and is very powerful. The APC Mole can transport troops by tunnelling underground.

Campaign

Premise
War Front: Turning Point is set in an alternate universe in which Adolf Hitler is killed in the early days of the war. A new chancellor comes to power, and under his rule, Operation Sea Lion succeeds, and Germany successfully conquers Great Britain. As a result, Germany, the Western Allies and the Soviet Union enter a technological cold war, resulting in various new advanced technologies on both sides.

German Campaign
The campaign opens 1000 days after the German invasion of Great Britain, where Oberstleutnant Roland Hellmann, under General Hardt takes control of London. While pushing back Allied resistance north, Hardt reveals to be working with the German Resistance, an undercover wing of the Wehrmacht under Dietrich Preiss; however, Hellmann is uninterested in their means of conduct. He is then sent to rescue Elsa Adler, a female German spy behind Soviet lines of the Eastern Front. There it is revealed that the Soviets are using weapons to cool the environment to their advantage, with Adler being pursued by Aleksei Mikhalkov of the Red Army. Upon Adler's rescue, she reveals Soviet plans to build a range of new super-weapons and conquer Germany. To prevent this, they join up entirely to Preiss' resistance, and with the help of American Colonel John Lynch, they press on to take out the current Nazi leaders in order to make peace and ally with Britain and the rest of the Western Allies in hope of suppressing further conflict with the Soviets. This operation is successful; despite Nazi attempts to even destroy Berlin in the process.

Back at Berlin, General Wells of Britain arrives to sign the peace treaty with Hardt, only to be interrupted by a surprise Soviet attack on the capital. While the Allies and Germans recover, it becomes apparent that the previous reports which Adler obtained were fabricated by the Soviets themselves so the German Resistance would kill the Chancellor, thus bringing Germany into civil war, while the Soviets benefit and conquer all of Eastern Europe. The Soviets are held off momentarily, in order for Hellmann to locate and secure a top-secret German weapons base that houses plans for experimental weapons. During another push against the Soviets, Preiss however is captured, and he is used to lure both the Germans and Allies into a trap, yet eventually is rescued.

As Hardt and Hellmann begin the assault on Moscow, Mikhalkov disguised as a German exoskeleton troop, kidnaps Adler via false a transmission. Hardt order the final strike against the Kremlin itself, but he stops just as the last remaining Soviets raise the white flag of surrender. Meanwhile, Hellmann confronts Mikhalkov, firing on a transmission tower allowing it to destroy Mikhalkov's suit. Instead of defeat, Mikhalkov instead causes the remains to self-destruct, yet Hellmann evades in time. Hardt and Lynch give their victory speeches, and the final scene closes with Adler and Hellmann kissing.

Reception

The game received "average" reviews according to the review aggregation website Metacritic. X-Play found that the "alternate history stuff keeps the stale setting interesting without getting completely wacky", while GameSpot commented on the balance of real-life and fictional units, being a "good thing because battles remain grounded in real-world combat and don't go overboard with high-tech gadgetry", going on to say: "Digital Reality strikes an almost perfect balance here between real history and 'what if?' ruminations".

Many reviewers however felt the RTS gameplay was still too conventional, regardless of the subject matter. IGN found that, "while War Front isn’t anything particularly new, it does traditional very solidly and creates a decent action atmosphere". PC Gamer similarly agreed by concluding: "War Front is a solid and entertaining game, though far less original than it purports to be". Because of the game's traditional RTS formula, Eurogamer reviewed the title while at the same time satires reviews in general by outlining the traditional conventions in most reviews, such as concluding: "Lazy conclusion? Wrap things up with a witty line that leaves readers grinning. Or, just stop writing in the middl..."

GameSpy criticised the first-person shooter aspect for being "useless in a game that moves so fast" and even "may also cause lesser computers to slow to a crawl". Graphically, GameSpot felt: "The dark, gritty look of the game makes most levels a treat for the eyes when you're simply gawking at the scenery" yet at times can be "so dark and dense with detail that units are obscured".

References

External links
 

Real-time strategy video games
Windows games
Windows-only games
2007 video games
Video games about World War II alternate histories
Video games set in the Soviet Union
Video games developed in Hungary
Dieselpunk
CDV Software Entertainment games
Multiplayer and single-player video games
Digital Reality games